Mumps, Etc. is the fourth studio album by American band Why?. It was released by Anticon in the United States on October 9, 2012 and by City Slang in Europe on October 8, 2012.

Critical reception
At Metacritic, which assigns a weighted average score out of 100 to reviews from mainstream critics, Mumps, Etc. received an average score of 62% based on 19 reviews, indicating "generally favorable reviews".

Mike Lechevallier of Slant Magazine said, "Mumps, Etc. isn't a career-defining moment like Alopecia, but it's a celebratory return to form for Why?, reuniting the band with the key attributes that ignited their creativity in the first place." Ryan Reed of Paste called it "their most layered, headphone-friendly set to date, utilizing an eight-member choir and a string quartet, not to mention plenty of harps, flutes and ass-blasting rhythms."

Alarm included it on the "50 Favorite Albums of 2012" list.

Track listing

Personnel
Credits adapted from the album's liner notes.

 Yoni Wolf – music, production, recording, mixing
 Josiah Wolf – music, production, recording
 Doug McDiarmid – music
 Eric Michener – claps
 James Kerr – flugelhorn
 Ryan Williams – double bass
 Kelsey Pickford – woodwinds
 Buffi Jacobs – cello
 Brandon Stewart – French horn
 Stephan Beall – violin, viola
 Laura Max – harp
 Elizabeth Knight – vocals
 Liz Wolf – vocals
 Andrew Broder – vocals
 Nathan Goodrich – vocals
 Brent 'Snake' Benedict – recording
 Graham Marsh (producer) – mixing
 John Horesco IV – mastering

References

External links
 

2012 albums
Why? (American band) albums
Anticon albums
City Slang albums